The Lehman family is a prominent family of Jewish German-Americans who founded the financial firm Lehman Brothers. Some were also involved in American politics. Members have married into the prominent Morgenthau, Loeb, and Bronfman families.

The family traces back to Abraham Lehmann, a cattle merchant in Rimpar, Bavaria, who changed his Yiddish (German-Jewish) surname Löw (Loeb) to the German Lehman.

Family tree 
Some of the family members include:

Abraham Lehmann, born Abraham Löw, cattle merchant in Rimpar, Bavaria
 Zeira Lehmann Schloss (1810–1902), remained in Germany
 Berta Low Lehmann Schwab (born 1812), remained in Germany
 Seligmann Lehmann (1814–1890), remained in Germany
 Fratel Lehmann (1817–1817), died as a newborn
 Anna Lehmann Roman (born 1820), remained in Germany
 Henry Lehman (1822–1855), born Hayum Lehmann, founder of H. Lehman, which became Lehman Brothers, married to Rosa Wolf, 4 children
Bertha Lehman Rosenheim
Harriet Lehman Weil, married Moses Weil, 5 children 
Leon Weil
Blanche Weil
Hannah Weil
Harry L. Weil
Elsie Rose Weil, married Leon Weil, 2 children
Helen Weil Benjamin (1905-1996)
George Leon Weil (1907–1995), nuclear physicist
David Lehman
Meyer H. Lehman
 Emanuel Lehman (1827–1907), born Mendel Lehmann, co-founder of Lehman Brothers, married to Pauline Sondheim (1843–1871), 4 children
Milton Lehman
Harriet Philip Lehman, married her cousin Sigmund M. Lehman, son of her uncle Mayer Lehman 
Evelyn Philip Lehman, married Jules Ehrich, 4 children:
May Ehrich (born 1889)
Pauline Ehrich (1893), married Monroe Gutman
Dorothy Ehrich (born 1895), married John C. Mayer, 3 children
Jane Mayer (born 1919), married Harold Field
John Mayer (born 1921), married Dale Shoup, daughter of economist Carl Shoup and granddaughter of businessman Paul Shoup
William Mayer (1925–2017), composer, married Meredith Nevins, daughter of historian and journalist Allan Nevins, 3 children
Steven Mayer (born 1952)
Jane Mayer (born 1955), journalist, married to William B. Hamilton
Cynthia Mayer (born 1958)
 Ruth Ehrich (born 1900), married Ralph Friedman, 2 children
 Philip Lehman (1861–1947), married to Carrie Lauer (–1937)
Pauline Lehman, married to Henry Ickelheimer (1868–1940) of Heidelbach, Ickelheimer & Co., 2 children
Jean Ickelheimer Stralem, married to Donald Stralem, 2 children
Sandra Jean Stralem, married Robert A. Russell, 2 children
Donna Russell Cronin 
 Robin Becker Maki
 Sharon Lynn Stralem married Ralph Albee Phraner Jr.
Philip Henry Isles (1912–1960), changed surname from Ickelheimer, married to model Lillian Fox, 3 children, divorced, she remarried Stephane Groueff
Jill Isles Blanchard, married to Guillermo B. Aguilera, divorced and remarried to Richard F. Blanchard.
Pauline Aguilera Longano (born 1967), married to Nicholas Longano in 1998
Tina Isles Barney (born 1945), photographer, married to John Joseph Barney in 1966
Philip Henry Isles II, married to Alexandra Moltke (1947–)
Adam Isles (1969–), married to Hannah Harrison Bond
 Robert Lehman (1891–1969), married three times
married Ruth S. (née Lamar) Rumsey (born 1902) in 1929, divorced 1931, no children
married Ruth "Kitty" (Leavitt) Meeker (1904–1984), daughter of William Homer Leavitt and Ruth Bryan Owen, and granddaughter of United States Secretary of State, William Jennings Bryan; 1 child
 Robert "Robin" Owen Lehman Jr. (born 1936), married to Aki Lehman, 2 children, before marrying music theorist Marie Rolf, 2 children
Philip Lehman
Kate Lehman
Rolf Lehman
 Morgan Lehman
married Lee "Elena" (Anz) Lynn (1919-2006) in 1952; no children
 Aaron Lehman (1829-1924)
 Mayer Lehman (1830–1897), co-founder of Lehman Brothers, married to Babette Newgass, sister-in-law of Isaias W. Hellman
 Lisette Lehman Fatman, married to Morris Fatman, clothing manufacturer, 2 children
Margaret Fatman married to composer Werner Josten, 2 children
Peter Josten
 Eileen Josten Lowe, married Dr. Charles U. Lowe in 1955, 4 children
 Elinor Fatman Morgenthau, married Henry Morgenthau Jr., U.S. Secretary of the Treasury, 3 children
Robert M. Morgenthau, District Attorney for New York County
Henry Morgenthau III, author and television producer, married Ruth Schachter Morgenthau (1931-2006), advisor to President Jimmy Carter, 3 children
Henry (Ben) Morgenthau (1964)
Kramer Morgenthau (1966), cinematographer, married Tracy Fleischman in 2011 
Sarah Elinor Morgenthau Wessel (1963), married to Carlton Wessel in 1993
Joan Morgenthau Hirschhorn (1922-2012) married Fred Hirschhorn Jr. in 1957, 3 children
Elizabeth Hirschhorn Wilson, married Bruce Wilson
Joan Hirschhorn Bright, married David Bright
Elinor H. Hirschhorn, married Michael J. Carroll in 1996
 Clara Lehman Limburg
Mabel Limburg Rossbach married to Max J. H. Rossbach
June Bingham Birge (1919-2007), married U.S. Congressman Jonathan Brewster Bingham (1914-1986), four children; remarried to Robert B. Birge in 1987, no children
Sherrell Bingham Downes
Timothy Woodbridge Bingham
Claudia Bingham Meyers
June Mitchell Esselstyn (1942-1999) married Erik C. Esselstyn, 2 children
June Eriksson (Jody) Esselstyn
Blakeman Bingham Esselstyn 
Sigmund M. Lehman married his cousin Harriet Philip Lehman, daughter of his uncle Emanuel Lehman
Allan S. Lehman married Evelyn Schiffer 
Ellen Lehman Long
Orin Lehman
Harold M. Lehman, married Cecile R. Seligman, 2 daughters 
Betty Lehman Asiel married to E. Nelson Asiel, 3 children
Harold N. Asiel 
Terri L. Grammas
 John H. Asiel
Susan Lehman, married Joseph Cullman (1912–2004) in 1935, one daughter.
Dorothy Cullman Treisman
 Harriet Lehman (1860–1948), married to Philip Goodhart
Arthur Lehman Goodhart (1891-1978), British academic; married Cecily Carter, 3 children
Philip Goodhart (1925-2015), British politician; married Valerie Forbes Winant, niece of John Gilbert Winant; 7 children
Arthur Goodhart
Sarah Goodhart
David Goodhart, (1956-) journalist; married to journalist Lucy Kellaway; 4 children
Rachel Goodhart
Harriet Goodhart
Rebecca Goodhart
Daniel Goodhart
William Goodhart (1933-2017)
 Charles Goodhart (1936-)  
Howard Goodhart 
 Helen Goodhart (1887–1985), married to Frank Altschul (1887–1981), banker
Margaret Lang, married to journalist Daniel Lang, 3 children
Frances Lang Labaree
Helen Lang
 Cecily Lang Kooyman
Edith Altschul Graham (died 2003), married Robert Claverhouse Graham, 3 children
Robert C. Graham Jr. married Christine Denny, daughter of Charles R. Denny, 2 children, divorced. Married Julie Moran, 1 Child. 
Elizabeth Ashley Graham, married Adam Marc Lindemann, son of George Lindemann
 Kathryn Graham
James Wesley Hawkes Graham
Michael C. Graham 
 Kathryn G. Graham
 Arthur Goodhart Altschul Sr. (1920–2002), investment banker
married Stephanie Rosemary Wagner in 1956, she later died in a plane crash, 2 children
Stephen Altschul (1957-), mathematician and researcher; married to Caroline Kershaw James
James Altschul
 William Altschul (1998-)
 Charles Altschul
married Siri von Reis (divorced 1972), 3 children
Arthur Goodhart Altschul Jr. (1964–), married 2013 Rula Jebreal Divorced 2016 
Emily Helen Altschul (1966–), married John Miller in 2002
Serena Altschul (1970-), broadcast journalist and MTV host
Arthur Lehman (1873–1936), married to Adele Lewisohn Lehman, daughter of Adolph Lewisohn (1849–1938), mining magnate, 3 children
Dorothy Lehman Bernhard (1903 – 1969), married to investment banker Richard Jaques Bernhard in 1923, 2 children
Robert Arthur Bernhard (1928-2019)
William Lehman Bernhard (born 1931), married Catherine Cahill, daughter of attorney John T. Cahill in 1974 and Grace Pickens, a member of the Pickens Sisters
 Helen Lehman (1905–1989), lawyer, married to Benjamin Buttenwieser (1900–1991), banker at Kuhn, Loeb & Co., son of Joseph L. Buttenwieser
Lawrence B. Buttenwieser, lawyer at Katten Muchin Rosenman, married to Ann Lubin, daughter of Isador Lubin
Jill Ann Buttenwieser Schloss, married to Richard Perry Schloss
Carol Buttenwieser Sharp
 Peter Lubin Buttenwieser (1965), married to Susan Helen Upton in 1995
Peter L. Buttenwieser, philanthropist, married to Elizabeth Werthan
Paul A. Buttenwieser, psychiatrist
 Frances Lehman Loeb (1906–1996), married to John Langeloth Loeb Sr. (son of Carl M. Loeb), 5 children
 John Langeloth Loeb Jr. (1930–), businessman
married to Nina Sundby from 1960, 1 child
Alexandra Loeb Driscoll, married to Joseph Edward Driscoll, 2 children
Aidan Edward Driscoll
Allegra Frances Driscoll
married to Meta Martindell Harrsen, 1 child
Nicholas M. Loeb (1976–)
married to Sharon J. Handler in 2011
Judith Loeb Chiara married to Richard N. Beaty, married and divorced from Marco Chiara, the son of the Italian novelist Piero Chiara
Arthur Lehman Loeb
Deborah Loeb Brice
 Ann Loeb Bronfman (1932–2011), married to Edgar Bronfman Sr. (1929–2013)
Samuel Bronfman (1954), married to Melanie Mann.
Edgar Bronfman Jr. (1955)
married to Sherry Brewer from 1979-1991, 3 children
Benjamin Bronfman (1982); one child with Mathangi "Maya" Arulpragasam (1975)
Ikhyd Edgar Arular Bronfman (2009)
Vanessa Bronfman 
Hannah Bronfman (1987-), married Brendan Fallis (2017)
married Clarisa Alcock San Román in 1993, 4 children
Aaron Bronfman 
Bettina Bronfman 
Erik Bronfman 
Clarissa Bronfman
Matthew Bronfman (1959)
married Fiona Woods, divorced 1997, 3 children
Gabriela Talia Bronfman
Eli Miles Bronfman
 Jeremy Samuel Bronfman
married Lisa Belzberg, daughter of Canadian businessman Samuel Belzberg, 3 children, divorced
Sasha Bronfman
Tess Bronfman
 Ezekiel Bronfman
married Stacey Kaye in 2005, 1 child, divorced in 2016
Coby Benjamin Bronfman
 married Melanie Lavie in 2017, 1 child
Holly Bronfman Lev, married to Yoav Lev. She is a convert to Hinduism and has taken the name Bhavani Lev.
 Adam Bronfman
Irving Lehman (1876–1945), U.S. lawyer and politician, married to Sissie Straus, daughter of Nathan Straus, no children
Herbert H. Lehman (1878–1963), 45th Governor of New York; married Edith Louise Altschul in 1910 (sister of banker Frank Altschul), 3 children
Hilda Jane Lehman de Vadetzky Paul Wise (1921–1974), married three times, Her first marriage to Boris de Vadetzky in 1940 ended in divorce in 1944, no children; her second marriage to Eugene L. Paul in 1945 resulted in divorce, no children; her third marriage also resulted in divorce, 3 children
 Peter Lehman Wise
married Sharon Anne McAuliffe in 1977, divorced, 1 child
 Catherine Jane Wise, married to David Giffen
married Marylou Hanover, 1 child
 Matthew Lehman Wise 
 Stephanie Wise
 Deborah Jane Wise, married Peter N. Sheridan in 1971
 Eli Wise 
Peter Gerald Lehman (1917-1944); in 1938, he married Peggy Lashanska Rosenbaum, daughter of soprano Hulda Lashanska, 2 children; he was killed while serving during World War II.
Penelope "Penny" Lehman Karp (born 1940) married to Stanley Mortimor Karp in 1964
Wendy Lehman (1942)
John Robert Lehman

References

Further reading

External links
The Jewish Daily Forward: "The Lehmans? They’ve Moved On. Sad? A Little" September 26, 2008
Full text of "John L. Loeb Collection" retrieved October 28, 2015

 
Jewish-American families
Business families of the United States
American people of German-Jewish descent
Jewish-German families
Lehman Brothers